Mustafa Jalal (born 2 February 1983) is a Qatari footballer who plays as a center back for Al-Shahania . He previously played for the Qatar national team between 2003 and 2007.

Club career statistics
Statistics accurate as of 21 December 2014

2Includes Sheikh Jassem Cup.
3Includes AFC Champions League.

See also
List of one-club men

References

1983 births
Living people
Al-Khor SC players
Al-Shahania SC players
Qatari footballers
Qatar Stars League players
Qatar international footballers
Qatari people of Iranian descent
Qatari Second Division players
Association football midfielders